Protein misfolding cyclic amplification (PMCA) is an amplification technique (conceptually like PCR but not involving nucleotides) to multiply misfolded prions originally developed by Soto and colleagues. It is a test for spongiform encephalopathies like CWD or BSE.

Technique
The technique initially incubates a small amount of abnormal prion with an excess of normal protein, so that some conversion takes place. The growing chain of misfolded protein is then blasted with ultrasound, breaking it down into smaller chains and so rapidly increasing the amount of abnormal protein available to cause conversions. By repeating the cycle, the mass of normal protein is rapidly changed into the prion being tested for.

Development
PMCA was originally developed to, in vitro, mimic prion replication with a similar efficiency to the in vivo process, but with accelerated kinetics. PMCA is conceptually analogous to the polymerase chain reaction - in both systems a template grows at the expense of a substrate in a cyclic reaction, combining growing and multiplication of the template units.

Replication
PMCA has been applied to replicate the misfolded protein from diverse species. The newly generated protein exhibits the same biochemical, biological, and structural properties as brain-derived PrPSc and strikingly it is infectious to wild type animals, producing a disease with similar characteristics as the illness produced by brain-isolated prions.

Automation
The technology has been automated, leading to a dramatic increase in the efficiency of amplification. Now, a single cycle results in a 2500-fold increase in sensitivity of detection over western blotting, whereas 2 and 7 consecutive cycles result in 6 million and 3 billion-fold increases in sensitivity of detection over western blotting, a technique widely used in BSE surveillance in several countries.

Sensitivity
It has been shown that PMCA is capable of detecting as little as a single molecule of oligomeric infectious PrPSc. PMCA possesses the ability to generate millions infectious units, starting with the equivalent to one PrPSc oligomer; well below the infectivity threshold.  This data demonstrates that PMCA has a similar power of amplification as PCR techniques used to amplify DNA. It opens a great promise for development of a highly sensitive detection of PrPSc, and for understanding the molecular basis of prion replication. Indeed, PMCA has been used by various groups to PrPSc in blood of animals experimentally infected with prions during both the symptomatic and pre-symptomatic phases as well as in urine.

Uses
The PMCA technology has been used by several groups to understand the molecular mechanism of prion replication, the nature of the infectious agent, the phenomenon of prion strains and species barrier, the effect of cellular components, to detect PrPSc in tissues and biological fluids and to screen for inhibitors against prion replication. Recent studies by the groups of Supattapone and Ma were able to produce prion replication in vitro by PMCA using purified PrPC and recombinant PrPC with the sole addition of synthetic polyanions and lipids. These studies have shown that infectious prions can be produced in the absence of any other cellular component and constitute some of the strongest evidence in favor of the prion hypothesis.

Research in 2020 concluded that protein misfolding cyclic amplification could be used to distinguish between two progressive neurodegenerative diseases, Parkinson’s disease and multiple system atrophy, being the first process to give an objective diagnosis of Multiple System Atrophy instead of just a differential diagnosis.

See also
 Real-Time Quaking-Induced Conversion
 Western blotting

References

Biochemistry detection methods
Molecular biology
Laboratory techniques
Prions